Maisonnisses is a commune in the Creuse department in the Nouvelle-Aquitaine region in central France.

Geography
The small river Gartempe flows through the middle of the commune.

Population

Sights
 The church of Saint-Jean-Baptiste, dating from the fourteenth century.
 A war memorial.

See also
Communes of the Creuse department

References

Communes of Creuse